The Ford GT90 is a high performance concept car that was developed and manufactured by American car maker Ford. It was unveiled in January 1995 at the Detroit Auto Show. The car is currently on display at Hajek Motorsports Museum, Ames, Oklahoma.

Design 
The mid-engined GT90 is a spiritual successor to the Ford GT40, taking from it some styling cues, such as doors that cut into the roofline, but little else. In regard to angles and glass, the Ford GT90 was the first Ford to display the company's "New Edge" design philosophy. The GT90 was built around a honeycomb-section aluminum monocoque and its body panels were molded from carbon fiber.

Performance Data 

It has a redline of 6,300 rpm. It is equipped with a forced induction system that uses four Garrett T2 turbochargers. The engine architecture was based on the 90-degree Ford Modular engine family, based on the same architecture and bore and stroke as the 4.6-litre V8 engine, but with four more cylinders added, two more in each cylinder bank. This yielded a 90-degree V12, with a  bore and a  stroke with the cylinders arranged in two banks in a single casting. The power produced by the engine is delivered to the rear-wheels through a 5-speed manual transmission developed jointly by FF Developments and Ricardo. The exhaust of the GT90 gets so hot that it would be enough to damage the body panels, and thus ceramic tiles, similar to those on the Space Shuttle, are used to keep the car from melting.

The suspension is a double wishbone variant. The steering is a power-assisted rack-and-pinion. The brakes are ventilated discs.

Development 
The GT90 was built as a secret project by a small engineering team in just over six months. It shared many components including the transmission and chassis from the Jaguar XJ220, as Jaguar was also owned by Ford at the time. The V12 engine, unique to the GT90, was developed by using a Lincoln Town Car as a test mule, in which they put the prototype engine in order to refine it.

The GT90 was originally going to be the successor to the Ford GT40 and Ford GT70, and the predecessor to the Ford GT, but after the plan for production was cancelled, the chronology was changed, making the Ford GT the new successor to the GT40 and GT70.

Media 

The Ford GT90 appeared in the video games Need for Speed II, Sega GT 2002, Sega GT Online, Ford Racing 2, Ford Racing 3, Gran Turismo 2, Rush 2: Extreme Racing USA, TOCA Race Driver 2, Top Drives, Project Gotham Racing 3 and Ford Street Racing.

 Top Gear  
The car was featured on Top Gear in Series 34, Episode 6 (aired originally on 26th October 1995), tested by Jeremy Clarkson, while the car was still planned to enter production.'' In that episode, Jeremy was really delighted to test the GT90, as he couldn’t fit in the Ford GT40 (which had to be given to drive to a former Old Top Gear presenter Noel Edmonds two episodes earlier). However, Jeremy’s opinion about the GT90 would change, as shown in Series 3, Episode 1 (aired on 26th October 2003, the month and day is coincidentally the same as when the GT90 was tested 8 years back):

“And then, in 1995, there was the GT90.”
“I actually drove one back in the day, and it was horrid! Had a top speed of 40, it handled like a cartoon.”

References

External links
 Ford GT90 Concept

GT90